S/2003 J 24 (temporarily designated EJc0061) is a moon of Jupiter, discovered by Scott S. Sheppard et al. in 2003. It was independently found by amateur astronomer Kai Ly, who reported it on June 30, 2021. It was formally announced on 15 November 2021 in the MPEC.

Ly had previously recovered four "lost" moons of Jupiter in 2020: S/2003 J 23, S/2003 J 12, S/2003 J 4, and S/2003 J 2.

It belongs to the Carme group, made up of irregular retrograde moons orbiting Jupiter at a distance ranging between 23 and 24 Gm and at an inclination of about 165°.

References

External links
Discovery announcement at the Minor Planets Mailing List

Moons of Jupiter
Irregular satellites
20210630
Carme group
Moons with a retrograde orbit